Fredrik Kärrholm (born 1985) is a Swedish politician.  he serves as Member of the Riksdag representing the constituency of Stockholm Municipality. He is affiliated with the Moderate Party.

References 

Living people
1985 births
Place of birth missing (living people)
21st-century Swedish politicians
Members of the Riksdag 2022–2026
Members of the Riksdag from the Moderate Party